The Social Security Directorate is a directorate of the Scottish Government responsible for social security policy in Scotland. The directorate ensures the smooth and secure transition of benefits that are to be devolved to the Scottish Parliament, amounting to £2.8 billion.

Work of the directorate

As a result of work of the directorate, devolved powers were granted to the Scottish Parliament over social security policy in Scotland. In 2018, Social Security Scotland was formed.

Composition

Cabinet secretaries

 Shona Robison, MSP Cabinet Secretary for Social Justice, Housing and Local Government
 Ben Macpherson MSP, Minister for Social Security and Local Government]]

Management of the directorate

 Paul Johnston, Director-General Communities
 Stephen Kerr, Director of Social Security

See also

 Social Security Scotland 
 Scottish Government
 Directorates of the Scottish Government

References 

Directorates of the Scottish Government